Şeref Çınar (born 6 September 1948) is a Turkish cross-country skier. He competed at the 1968 Winter Olympics and the 1976 Winter Olympics.

References

External links
 

1948 births
Living people
Turkish male cross-country skiers
Olympic cross-country skiers of Turkey
Cross-country skiers at the 1968 Winter Olympics
Cross-country skiers at the 1976 Winter Olympics
People from Sarıkamış
20th-century Turkish people